Academy of Arts and Sciences may refer to:

 Academy of Sciences and Arts of Bosnia and Herzegovina
 Academy of Sciences and Arts of the Republika Srpska
 American Academy of Arts and Sciences
 American-Romanian Academy of Arts and Sciences
 Croatian Academy of Sciences and Arts
 Doclean Academy of Sciences and Arts
 European Academy of Sciences and Arts
 Galileiana Academy of Arts and Science
 Ghana Academy of Arts and Sciences
 Macedonian Academy of Sciences and Arts
 Macomb Academy of Arts and Sciences
 Montenegrin Academy of Sciences and Arts
 Polish Academy of Arts and Sciences
 Puerto Rico Academy of Arts and Sciences
 Royal Academy of Sciences and Arts of Belgium
 Royal Netherlands Academy of Arts and Sciences
 Russian Academy of Sciences
 Saginaw Arts and Sciences Academy
 Serbian Academy of Sciences and Arts
 Slovenian Academy of Sciences and Arts
 Sumner Academy of Arts & Science, US
 Swiss Academy of Arts and Sciences
 The Bay Academy for the Arts and Sciences
 Vojvodina Academy of Sciences and Arts
 Wilmington Academy of Arts and Sciences, US
 World Academy of Art and Science

Others
 Academy of Interactive Arts & Sciences, US
 Academy of Motion Picture Arts and Sciences, US
 Academy of Television Arts & Sciences, US
 Canadian Academy of Recording Arts and Sciences
 Filipino Academy of Movie Arts and Sciences Award
 International Academy of Digital Arts and Sciences, US
 International Academy of Television Arts and Sciences, US
 Mexican Academy of Film Arts and Sciences
 National Academy of Recording Arts and Sciences, US
 National Academy of Television Arts and Sciences, US